The Seohaean Expressway (Korean: 서해안 고속도로; Seohaean Gosok Doro), meaning "West Coast Expressway", is a freeway in South Korea, connecting Mokpo to Gunsan, Dangjin, and Seoul.

It is numbered 15. The entire length from Seoul to Mokpo is 345 km and the posted speed limit is 110 km/h, enforced primarily by speed cameras. It is connected of Seohae Grand Bridge in Pyeongtaek to Dangjin.

The branch expressways of the Seohaean Expressway are Seocheon–Gongju Expressway and Pyeongtaek–Siheung Expressway.

Typical facilities of this expressway is Seohae Bridge(Korean: 서해대교; Seohae Daegyo) which the total length of 7.3 km linking the Pyeongtaek(Gyeonggi Province) and Dangjin(Chungnam Province). The bridge is the third long bridge in the Republic of Korea.

The highway is a major highway linking the Seohaean Region(서해안권) for the first north–south axis (남북 제1축), the road through the South Jeolla Province, North Jeolla Province, South Chungcheong Province, Gyeonggi Province.

History 
 December 1991 – Construction begin
 May 1993 – Construction begin of Seohae Grand Bridge
 6 July 1994 – Seoul–Ansan segment opened to traffic.
 17 December 1996 – Ansan–Pyeongtaek segment opened to traffic.
 25 August 1998 – Mokpo–Muan segment opened to traffic.
 30 October 1998 – Gunsan–Seocheon segment opened to traffic.
 10 November 2000 – Seohae Grand Bridge segment opened to traffic. and Pyeongtaek–Dangjin segment opened to traffic.
 27 September 2001 – Dangjin–Seocheon segment opened to traffic.
 21 December 2001 – The last segment, Gunsan–Muan segment opened to traffic.
 30 July 2010 – Work begins to widen to 8 lanes in Ansan–Iljik Junction.
 23 November 2011 – Jungnim Junction opened to traffic.
 October 2014 – Seohae Bridge – W. Pyeongtaek Junction Section (10.3 km) road expansion started construction.
 November 2014 – The 10-lane expansion of the Ansan JCT – Jonam JCT (2.9 km) section was completed.
 June 2015 – The 10-lane expansion of the Jonam JCT – Mokgam IC (3.2 km) section was completed.
 23 December 2015 – The 10-lane expansion of the Mokgam IC – Iljik JCT (3.8 km) section was completed.
 3 July 2016 – Soha Junction opened to traffic.

Compositions

Lanes 
 Mokpo IC – Dangjin JC, Iljik JC-West Seoul End: 4
 Dangjin JC – Bibong IC, Maesong IC-Ansan JC, Jonam JC–Mokgam IC: 6
 Mokgam IC – Iljik JC, Bibong IC – Maesong IC, West Seoul TG-Jonam JC: 8
 Ansan-Iljik, Yangjae-Giheung, unjung Bridge and Seoul Ring Road (Rigid Pavement) 130 km JC –  : 10

Length 
346.1 km (215.1 mi)

Speed limits
 Jungnim JC – Maesong IC : 110 km/h
 Maesong IC – Seoul(Geumcheon) : 100 km/h
 Mokpo – Jungnim JC : 90 km/h

List of facilities

IC: Interchange, JC: Junction, SA: Service area, TG:Tollgate

Events
MBC's Entertainment program, Infinite Challenge held a <Seohaean Expressway Festival> in Haengdam Island Service area in June 2011.

See also
 Roads and expressways in South Korea
 Transportation in South Korea

External links
 MOLIT South Korean Government Transport Department

 
Expressways in South Korea
Roads in South Jeolla
Roads in North Jeolla
Roads in South Chungcheong
Roads in Gyeonggi
Roads in Seoul